Raion Yance Hill (born September 2, 1976) is a former professional American football safety in the National Football League (NFL). He played two seasons for the Buffalo Bills.

He attended Brother Martin High School and graduated in 1994. He then went on to play at Louisiana State University.

1976 births
Living people
People from Marrero, Louisiana
Players of American football from Louisiana
American football safeties
LSU Tigers football players
Buffalo Bills players